Jacob Lawrence Shuford (born April 16, 1952) was a rear admiral of the United States Navy. His career  included service in the Cold War, Kosovo War, and Operation Desert Fox. He commanded surface combatants, served on the staffs of the Chief of Naval Operations, the Joint Chiefs of Staff, and the Secretary of the Navy, coordinated Navy legislative activities in the United States Senate, and his final assignment as President of the Naval War College.

Naval career
Shuford was commissioned in 1974 from the Naval Reserve Officer Training Corps (NROTC) program at the University of South Carolina. He began his career at sea aboard the frigate , then served as the operations officer consecutively aboard the destroyer  and aboard the guided-missile destroyer . He later commanded the missile hydrofoil , operating extensively throughout the Caribbean Sea, and the guided-missile frigate . Under his command, Rodney M. Davis was a Battle "E" winner as part of the  Carrier Battle Group operating in the Western Pacific and the Persian Gulf. 

In January 1998, Shuford assumed command of the guided-missile cruiser , deploying to the operating areas of the Fifth and Sixth Fleets with the  Carrier Battle Group. Gettysburg was awarded the Battle Efficiency "E" for Cruiser-Destroyer Group 12.

Shufords first shore tour was as the Operations and Plans Officer for Commander, Naval Forces Korea. In Washington, D.C., he served on the staff of the Chief of Naval Operations in OPNAV N86, directing the Surface Combatant Force Level Study, and in OPNAV N3/N5 as chief of staff for the Navys Roles and Missions Organization. He also served as speechwriter and Special Assistant to the United States Secretary of the Navy. On the Joint Staff, he led a division in the Force Structure, Resources, and Assessments Directorate (J8).

From 1999 to 2001, Shuford coordinated the Navys legislative efforts in the United States Senate, and was selected to flag rank in this assignment. His first flag tour was as the Navys "Head Detailer," responsible for career development and assignment for the 370,000 personnel of the Navy.

Shuford was selected as an Olmsted Scholar in 1979, studying for two years in France at the Paris Institute of Political Science. He also received master's degrees in public administration from Harvard University with a concentration in finance and in national security studies and strategy from the Naval War College in Newport, Rhode Island, from which he graduated in 1991 with highest distinction.

From 12 August 2004 to 6 November 2008, Shuford served as the 51st President of the Naval War College, overseeing senior education and wargaming for the Navy. During his lengthy presidency, he directed an extensive restructuring of the colleges basic curriculum and initiated the Joint Force Maritime Component Commander Course for flag officers, the Maritime Staff Operators Course, and the Naval Operational Planner Course (NOPC). He led the college as it played the key role in designing the process for establishing a new national maritime strategy and in providing the geostrategic analysis to support it. He reinstituted Title 10 wargaming and initiated concept-development efforts to explore important warfare issues such as maritime ballistic missile defense, antisubmarine warfare, homeland defense organization, and the command and control of maritime forces. He also engaged in extensive diplomacy to establish an international network of naval colleges that could collaborate on the study of maritime security issues.

Admiral Shuford retired from the Navy in 2009.

Notes

References
 This article includes public domain text from the United States Navy official Web sites page United States Navy Biography: Rear Admiral Jacob Lawrence Shuford, President, Naval War College 
 Past Presidents page at Naval War College official Web site

External links 

Living people
1950s births
Year of birth uncertain
Presidents of the Naval War College
Sciences Po alumni
Harvard Kennedy School alumni
Naval War College alumni
Military personnel of the Cold War
United States Navy personnel of the Kosovo War
Recipients of the Defense Superior Service Medal
Recipients of the Legion of Merit
United States Navy admirals
University of South Carolina alumni
People from Bishopville, South Carolina